Ernie Grunwald (born 1970) is a Canadian actor who has made guest appearances in a number of notable television series.

Career

Grunwald has had recurring roles on One on One, The Suite Life of Zack & Cody (as Mr. Forgess), and Two of a Kind opposite Mary-Kate and Ashley Olsen. He has also guest starred on Friends, My Name Is Earl, NYPD Blue, Reno 911!, A.N.T. Farm, Walker, Texas Ranger, Supernatural, Grey's Anatomy, Two and a Half Men, Bones, The Mentalist, Weeds, and many other series. He guest starred as a restaurant manager in Monk ("Mr. Monk's 100th Case") and as a courier that lost a cooler containing a deadly virus in Psych ("Death is In the Air"). He also appeared as Walter in the Disney Channel Original Movie Good Luck Charlie, It's Christmas! in 2011.

He also made a cameo appearance in the 1992 Disney film The Mighty Ducks as a fan. He has also had roles in the feature films Cellular, It Takes Two, Men in Black II, and Stealing Harvard. Grunwald starred with Jason Priestley in Call Me Fitz.

Filmography

Film

Television

References

External links

1970 births
Living people
Best Supporting Actor in a Comedy Series Canadian Screen Award winners
Canadian expatriate male actors in the United States
Canadian male film actors
Canadian male television actors
Canadian male voice actors
People from Thornhill, Ontario
20th-century Canadian male actors
21st-century Canadian male actors